Luigi Cristiano Fagioli (9 June 1898 – 20 June 1952), nicknamed "the Abruzzi robber", was an Italian motor racing driver. Having won his last race at 53 years old, Fagioli holds the record for the oldest Formula One driver to win a race, and was the only winning Formula One driver born in the 19th century.

Career
Born in the small city of Osimo, in the Marche region of central Italy, as a boy Luigi Fagioli was fascinated by the relatively new invention of the automobile and the ensuing racing. Blessed with great natural driving instincts, a young Fagioli spent several years participating in hillclimbing and sports car races before entering Grand Prix racing in 1926. By 1930, his racing success led to an opportunity to join the Maserati team on the Grand Prix motor racing circuit. He immediately made his presence felt, winning the Coppa Ciano and Circuit of Avellino. In April of the following year he went head to head with Louis Chiron and his Bugatti Type 51 at the Monaco Grand Prix. In what is one of racing's most famous battles, Chiron eventually won but Fagioli showed how skilled he was in a car geared for great speed on long stretches, not the tight twists and short runs of Monte Carlo. Fagioli went on to take the victory at the Autodromo Nazionale Monza in Monza, Italy beating Chiron as well as fellow Italian greats,  Achille Varzi and Tazio Nuvolari. In 1932, Fagioli won the Grand Prix of Rome driving for Maserati but for the 1933 season he was signed by the Alfa Romeo team of Scuderia Ferrari.  Driving an Alfa Romeo P3, he won the Coppa Acerbo, the Grand Prix du Comminges, and the Italian Grand Prix.

A supremely confident Fagioli often displayed a fiery temper and retaliated against other drivers on the track when he felt they had done something wrong. Also, he frequently took chances that others might not and as such he developed a somewhat negative reputation after he had several significant race crashes. Nevertheless, his talents were considerable and for the 1934 season he was lured away by Mercedes to drive one of their Silver Arrows with the brilliant Hermann Lang as his chief mechanic. The move proved successful for Fagioli but his relationship with the German team manager and co-drivers was extremely difficult. In his very first race for Mercedes, one their cars dominated, a furious Fagioli abandoned his vehicle after having been given orders by team manager Alfred Neubauer to stay in second place and allow fellow Mercedes driver Manfred von Brauchitsch to win. Despite the problems, Fagioli remained part of the German team, earning his second consecutive Coppa Acerbo and together with Rudolf Caracciola, drove a Mercedes W25A to claim his second straight Italian Grand Prix title. Following this, Fagioli went on to take first place at the Spanish Grand Prix at the Circuito Lasarte.

For the 1935 racing season, his factory Mercedes was upgraded to a W25B model with which he captured the Monaco Grand Prix and the  AVUS and Penya Rhin Grand Prix races. However, his relationship with his teammates worsened, in particular, Rudolf Caracciola and in some races Fagioli tried to pass Caracciola against team orders. He left Mercedes at the end of the 1936 season and joined Auto Union where  his rivalry with Caracciola escalated, culminating at the Tripoli Grand Prix when Fagioli physically attacked his former teammate.

Health problems, including crippling rheumatism, soon began to severely affect Luigi Fagioli's racing ability. At the Coppa Acerbo he needed the aid of a cane just to walk and had no choice but to drop out of the race. With his health somewhat improved, following the end of World War II, 52-year-old Luigi Fagioli joined Alfa-Romeo's 1950 Formula One team driving the 158/159 Alfetta, earning five podium finishes in six races en route to finishing a remarkable third overall in the first ever FIA World Championship. He even entered the final round as one of three drivers in contention for the title, despite not winning a race. His only Grand Prix of 1951 was his last, but he nevertheless won the French Grand Prix with Juan-Manuel Fangio, earning the distinction of being the oldest person to ever win a Formula One race. During the race, the Alfa Romeo team manager ordered him to hand over his healthy car to Fangio while Fagioli would drive Fangio's car, which was plagued with engine problems. Ferrari had done the same, ordering José Froilán González to hand over to the quicker and more experienced Alberto Ascari; this was common practice in Grand Prix racing before 1957. Fangio battled hard with Ascari and took victory while Fagioli finished 11th and last in Fangio's original car, 22 laps down. Fagioli was so incensed by this that he retired from Grand Prix racing after this race.

For 1952, Fagioli signed with Lancia to drive sports cars and took great personal delight by finishing in third place in the Mille Miglia ahead of arch rival Rudolf Caracciola. Shortly after, while practising for the Monaco Grand Prix, which was run as a sports car race that year, he had what appeared to be a minor crash: however, his internal injuries were such that he died in hospital three weeks later.

Luigi Fagioli ranks as one of Italy's greatest race car drivers, and has the second-highest percentage of podium finishes in the Formula One World Championship (85.71%), after "one-time wonder" Dorino Serafini.

Major wins
Avusrennen  1935
Coppa Acerbo  1933, 1934
Coppa Ciano 1930
French Grand Prix/European Grand Prix 1951
Grand Prix du Comminges 1933
Italian Grand Prix 1933, 1934
Monaco Grand Prix 1935
Penya Rhin Grand Prix 1935
Spanish Grand Prix 1934

Racing record

Complete European Championship results
(key) (Races in bold indicate pole position) (Races in italics indicate fastest lap)

Complete Formula One World Championship results
(key) (Races in bold indicate pole position) (Races in italics indicate fastest lap)

* Two shared drives with Juan Manuel Fangio, resulting in positions 1 and 11, respectively. Each driver scored half points for the win.

Non-championship Formula One results
(key) (Races in bold indicate pole position) (Races in italics indicate fastest lap)

See also
 Trofeo Luigi Fagioli Hillclimb

References

External links

Official web site

1898 births
1952 deaths
Italian racing drivers
Italian Formula One drivers
Formula One race winners
Alfa Romeo Formula One drivers
Grand Prix drivers
Racing drivers who died while racing
Mille Miglia drivers
Sportspeople from the Province of Ancona
Sport deaths in Monaco
European Championship drivers